Raymond Maurice Legg was a male swimmer who was national junior champion at the age of thirteen and went on to compete for England..

Swimming career
He represented England and won a bronze medal in the 880 yards Freestyle Relay at the 1950 British Empire Games in Auckland, New Zealand.
Trophy winning water polo player with Bristol Central swimming team into the 1990s.

Personal life
During the Games in 1950 he lived at Downton Road, Knowle, Bristol and was a clerk by trade.. Later that decade he joined the "Avon and Somerset Constabulary River Police", policing the city docks, meeting ships captains and checking their cargo was "ship shape."
An active member of Bristol Central Swimming Club as swimmer/water polo player.

Married Mrs LMC Turner mid/late 1990's
Becoming Mr and Mrs Turner-Legg.
Whilst working part time for the
Port of Bristol in Bristol Harbourside as windsurfing instructors they taught students of all ages and backgrounds and
for both of Bristol's universities.
Ray continued swimming and 
competing in the Central water polo team whilst joining the Policeman's choir, with whom he successfully recorded and performed for years in venues from Bristol's West End, to London's Royal Albert Hall.

References
https://teamengland.org/commonwealth-games-history/auckland-1950

https://uk.teamunify.com/team/reczzcba/page/about-us/history

https://www.avonandsomerset.police.uk/about/history-of-the-force/

1932 births
2015 deaths
English male swimmers
Swimmers at the 1950 British Empire Games
Commonwealth Games medallists in swimming
Commonwealth Games bronze medallists for England
Medallists at the 1950 British Empire Games